The Evert House is a historic house at 2687 Logan Street in Highland Park, Illinois. The Highland Park Building Company built the house for Rev. W. W. Evert in 1872. The company, which built houses that buyers chose from pattern books, was responsible for many of Highland Park's early homes and community buildings. The house has a Second Empire design, a relatively uncommon style in the city. It features a mansard roof with two dormers and bracketed eaves.

The house was added to the National Register of Historic Places on September 29, 1982.

References

National Register of Historic Places in Lake County, Illinois
Houses on the National Register of Historic Places in Illinois
Second Empire architecture in Illinois
Houses completed in 1872
Highland Park, Illinois